United Nations Security Council resolution 1581, adopted unanimously on 18 January 2005, after recalling resolutions   1503 (2003) and 1534 (2004), the Council approved the extension of the terms of office of seven short-term judges at the International Criminal Tribunal for the former Yugoslavia (ICTY) in order to allow them to finish adjudicating the cases on which they had been working. It was the first Security Council resolution adopted in 2005.

The Security Council expected that extending the trial terms of judges would enhance proceedings and allow the ICTY to fulfil its commitments to the completion strategy. Acting on a request by the Secretary-General Kofi Annan, the Council extends the terms of ad litem judges as follows:

(a) Judge Rasoazanany and Judge Swart finish the Hadžihasanović case;
(b) Judge Brydensholt and Judge Eser finish the Orić case;
(c) Judge Thelin and Judge Van Den Wyngaert finish the Limaj case;
(d) Judge Canivell finish the Krajišnik case;
(e) Judge Szénási finish the Halilović case if he was assigned to it;
(f) Judge Hanoteau finish the Krajišnik case if he was assigned to it.

The Council noted the intention of the ICTY to finish the Hadžihasanović case by the end of September 2005, the Halilović case before the end of October 2005, the Orić and Limaj cases by the end of November 2005 and the Krajišnik case before the end of April 2006.

See also
 List of United Nations Security Council Resolutions 1501 to 1600 (2003–2005)
 Yugoslav Wars

References

External links
 
Text of the Resolution at undocs.org

 1581
2005 in Bosnia and Herzegovina
 1581
January 2005 events